Odilzhon Alisherovich Abdurakhmanov (born 18 March 1996) is a Kyrgyzstani footballer who plays for Maktaaral in the Kazakhstan Premier League, as well as the Kyrgyzstan national football team.

Career

Club
On 19 February 2021, Uzbekistan Super League club Bunyodkor announced the signings Abdurakhmanov.

Career statistics

Club

International

Statistics accurate as of match played 14 June 2022

International goals
Scores and results list Kyrgyzstan's goal tally first.

References

1996 births
Living people
Kyrgyzstani footballers
Kyrgyzstan international footballers
Association football midfielders
Kyrgyzstani people of Uzbek descent
Footballers at the 2018 Asian Games
2019 AFC Asian Cup players
Asian Games competitors for Kyrgyzstan